Chapman Glacier may refer to:
 Chapman Glacier (Palmer Land)
 Chapman Glacier (Victoria Land)